Divostin is a village of the city of Kragujevac in the Šumadija district of Serbia. According to the 2011 census, there were 422 inhabitants.

Over 100,000 Neolithic objects from Starčevo culture and Vinča culture were extracted in a number of searches between 1959 and 1971. Ceramics of the Cernavodă culture dating to the Early and Middle Bronze Age have been found in Divostin.

The Flores company, a renowned producer of exported rakija, is headquartered in Divostin.

References

Populated places in Šumadija District